Raul Gil (born January 27, 1938) is a Brazilian television presenter and singer. With a career spanning over 50 years, Gil has become one of the most famous Brazilian television presenters. He currently presents his own weekly program on SBT channel.

In July 2017 he was criticized for making racist remarks and "slit-eye" gestures towards the K-pop band KARD.

Filmography

References

External links
 

1938 births
Living people
People from São Paulo
Brazilian people of Spanish descent
Brazilian television presenters